Baldissero Torinese is a comune (municipality) in the Metropolitan City of Turin in the Italian region Piedmont, located about  east of Turin.

Baldissero Torinese borders the following municipalities: Castiglione Torinese, Torino, San Mauro Torinese, Pavarolo, Pino Torinese, and Chieri.

Baldissero Torinese is twinned with Grude (Bosnia and Herzegovina) since 2002.

References

Cities and towns in Piedmont